Sarasas Ektra School (Thai: โรงเรียนสารสาสน์เอกตรา) is a Catholic bilingual co-educational school in central Bangkok. As of 2009, the school had approximately 2,900 students and conducted a fully bilingual program in Thai and English from kindergarten 1 (3-year-olds) to matayom 6 (17-year-olds). The school occupies three campuses in the Bang Phongphang Sub-district of Yan Nawa District. A nursery class for two-year-old children was introduced in May 2009.

Sarasas Ektra is one of 24 Sarasas-affiliated schools, 15 of which have bilingual programs.

Further reading
 Developing Literacy in Second Language Learners, Report of the National Literacy Panel or Language Minorities and Youth, Center for Applied Linguistics, Washington DC, 2006, p. 397
 Swain, M. and Lapkin, S. Evaluating Bilingual Education, 1982, cited in Lin, A.M.Y. and Man, E.Y.F., Bilingual Education: Southeast Asian Perspectives, University of Hong Kong Press, 2009, p. 20

External links
 Sarasas Ektra School Website
Topic: Sarasas Schools- All campuses   
 http://www.freelancetefl.com/forum/index.php/topic,258.60.html
 http://www.freelancetefl.com/forum/index.php/topic,258.15.html

Bilingual schools
Schools in Bangkok
Educational institutions established in 1995
1995 establishments in Thailand
Yan Nawa district